His Trust is a 1911 American silent drama film directed by D. W. Griffith.  It concerns "The faithful devotion and self- sacrifice of an old negro servant," who is played in blackface by Wilfred Lucas.  The film's sequel is His Trust Fulfilled. Prints of the film survive in the film archives of the Museum of Modern Art and the Library of Congress.

Cast

 Wilfred Lucas – George
 Dell Henderson – Col. Frazier
 Claire McDowell – Col. Frazier's wife
 Edith Haldeman – The Fraziers' child
 Linda Arvidson
 Dorothy Bernard
 Kate Bruce
 Adele DeGarde
 Gladys Egan
 Francis J. Grandon – Confederate soldier
 Joseph Graybill – Union soldier
 Guy Hedlund – Black servant
 Grace Henderson
 Harry Hyde
 Adolph Lestina – Black servant/Confederate soldier
 Jeanie MacPherson – Woman at farewell
 Violet Mersereau
 W. Chrystie Miller – Man at farewell
 Alfred Paget – Messenger/Confederate soldier
 Lottie Pickford – Woman at farewell
 Vivian Prescott – Woman at farewell
 W. C. Robinson – Union soldier
 Mack Sennett – Confed. soldier delivering sword, death notice
 Kate Toncray – Black servant (unconfirmed)
 Charles West - Man at farewell
 Dorothy West

See also
 1911 in film
 D. W. Griffith filmography

References

External links

 His Trust on YouTube
His Trust; allrovi listing
His Trust and its sequel His Trust Fulfilled available together for download at Archive.org

1911 films
Films directed by D. W. Griffith
1911 short films
American silent short films
American black-and-white films
Biograph Company films
1911 drama films
Silent American drama films
1910s American films